Doenrade is a village in the southern Dutch province of Limburg. Historically its name has also been spelled Dudenrode and Doenradt and was along a main trade route between Germany and southern Limburg. Until 1982 it was a part of the municipality of Oirsbeek but was transferred to the municipality of Schinnen. In 2019 that municipality merged with Onderbanken and Nuth to form Beekdaelen. It lies about 4 km southeast of Sittard and borders the town of Hillensberg to the north.

In 2010, Doenrade had 1,135 inhabitants. The area of the town is 4.6 km², and contained 460 households.

, which was built around 1117, is situated on the edge of the town and is a popular place to stay for tourists visiting Limburg as it has been turned into a hotel and restaurant. The towns rolling hills, bucolic pastureland, and historic buildings make it seems to visitors that they've stepped back in time.

Gallery

References

Populated places in Limburg (Netherlands)
Beekdaelen